The Boulevard Connection are Typhoon, Sek and Marak - hip hop producers and musicians from Copenhagen, Denmark.

Danish hip hop groups
Musicians from Copenhagen